Apremont-sur-Allier (literally Apremont on Allier) is a commune in the Cher department in the Centre-Val de Loire region of France.

Geography
The river forms the boundary between the commune and the department of Nièvre.

Population

Sights

 The church, dating from the 13th century.
 The castle, dating from the 12th century and the surrounding "Parc Floral" gardens.
 A museum, in the stables of the castle.

The village is a member of the Les Plus Beaux Villages de France ("The most beautiful villages of France") association.

See also
Communes of the Cher department

References

External links

 Official website of Apremont-sur-Allier 

Communes of Cher (department)
Plus Beaux Villages de France